CemAir (Pty) Ltd is a privately owned airline operating in South Africa, servicing popular tourist destinations and important business towns, as well as leasing aircraft to other airlines across Africa and the Middle East. The airline is based in Johannesburg.

History
The company was formed in 2005 with the purpose of operating turboprop commuter aircraft, with the initial fleet consisting of 1 Cessna Grand Caravan aircraft and 3 Beechcraft 1900C aircraft.
 
In January 2018, the South African Civil Aviation Authority withdrew the Certificate of Airworthiness for 12 of the airline's aircraft due to allegedly unqualified personnel certifying the aircraft as airworthy. It was subsequently forced by the authorities to suspend operations in late 2018. The airline successfully launched a High Court challenge and the grounding was overturned. The CAA then again grounded the Airline in January 2019 and CemAir challenged the decision before the Civil Aviation Appeal Committee. On 29 April 2019, the CAAC issued a judgement in favour of the airline, calling the CAA's actions "irrational, arbitrary, unreasonable and procedurally unfair" and "factually wrong."
 The decision was challenged and the CAA decision was overturned by the Civil Aviation Appeal Committee.

In January 2021, CemAir signed an interline agreement with Ethiopian Airlines.

Corporate affairs

Head office
CemAir's head office and engineering and maintenance facility are located in Hangar 6 OR Tambo International Airport.

Destinations

Charter operations
Based at OR Tambo International Airport, South Africa, a large portion of the fleet is deployed outside of South Africa. The main foreign deployments are to Mali in West Africa, Gaborone, Botswana, and Juba, South Sudan.

Scheduled destinations

Domestic 
 Bloemfontein - Bloemfontein Airport 
 Cape Town - Cape Town International Airport 
 George - George Airport 
 Hoedspruit - Hoedspruit Airport 
 Johannesburg - O.R. Tambo International Airport hub
 Margate - Margate Airport 
 Plettenberg Bay - Plettenberg Bay Airport
 Sishen - Sishen Airport
 Richards Bay - Richards Bay Airport suspended
 Kimberley - Kimberley Airport
Durban - King Shaka International Airport
Gqeberha (Port Elizabeth) - Chief Dawid Stuurman International Airport

International 
 Luanda, Angola - Quatro de Fevereiro International Airport
 Lusaka, Zambia - Kenneth Kaunda International Airport suspended
 Maputo, Mozambique - Maputo International Airport
 Vilankulo, Mozambique - Vilankulo Airport

Fleet

, the CemAir fleet consists of the following aircraft:

Accidents and incidents 
CemAir suffered two hull losses in 2008 with aircraft leased out to 3rd parties, one in South Sudan and the other in the Democratic Republic of the Congo.

On 2 May 2008, a CemAir-owned Beechcraft 1900 - registered in Kenya and operated by Kenyan-based Flex Air Cargo - was flying from Wau to Juba, South Sudan when it crashed near Rumbek, killing all nineteen passengers and two crew.  Among the passengers were two senior officials of the Sudan People's Liberation Army and their wives.
On 1 September 2008, an Air Serv-leased nineteen passenger Beechcraft 1900C crashed in the Democratic Republic of the Congo, about 15 km northwest of Bukavu carrying two crew and fifteen passengers.  The aircraft was wet leased at the time and flown by crew from Cemair, which was then based at Lanseria International Airport, Johannesburg, South Africa. The flight was arriving at Bukavu following technical service at N'Dolo Airport, Kinshasa.  The aircraft crashed into a mountainous ridge.  Passengers included twelve Congolese, one French, one Indian, and one Canadian. All 17 occupants were killed.

References

Airlines of South Africa
Airlines established in 2005
Companies based in Johannesburg